Izatha prasophyta is a moth of the family Oecophoridae. It is endemic to New Zealand, where it is known from the North Island, except Hawkes Bay or the Wairarapa. Larvae likely feed on rotting wood although larvae of this species have been reared on the fruiting body of the bracket fungus Bjerkandera adusta. Adults are on the wing from November to February.

Taxonomy 
This species was first described by Edward Meyrick in 1883 using two specimens collected at Taranaki and Wellington in January and February and named Semiocosma prasophyta. Meyrick gave a more detailed description of this species in 1884. In 1915 Meyrick placed this species in the genus Izatha. In 1928 George Hudson followed this placement and discussed and illustrated this species under the name Izatha prasophyta. This placement was confirmed in 1988 by J. S. Dugdale. Robert Hoare redescribed this species in 2010 and also confirmed this placement. The male lectotype, collected at the Wellington Botanic Garden, is held at the Natural History Museum, London.

Description
 
Meyrick described this species as follows:

The wingspan is 16–22.5 mm for males and 19.5–26 mm for females. This species can be distinguished from Izatha peroneanella as it has olive-green coloured forewings that lack the longitudinal black markings of that species.

Distribution

This species is endemic to New Zealand and it is found throughout the North Island with the exception of the Hawkes Bay and the Wairarapa.

Habitat and host species
This species inhabits native forest. Larvae have been reared from an unidentified log on a beach, and another from a fruiting body of the bracket fungus Bjerkandera adusta growing on an unidentified rotting stump.

Behaviour 
Adults are on wing from November to February and are rarely attracted to light. When resting the adult holds its wing flat and slightly overlapping and its antennae close to its body. Its intermediate legs are heavily tufted and coloured pale. Extended at rest they break up the outline of the moth and enhance its cryptic colouring.

References

Oecophorinae
Moths described in 1883
Moths of New Zealand
Endemic fauna of New Zealand
Taxa named by Edward Meyrick
Endemic moths of New Zealand